is a japanese football manager and former player. His brother Ryo Kobayashi is also a former footballer. He is the currently manager J2 League club of JEF United Chiba.

Club career
Kobayashi was born in Saitama on January 27, 1978. In 1999, when he was a Komazawa University student, he joined the J1 League club Verdy Kawasaki (later Tokyo Verdy). He became a regular player as a defensive midfielder during his first season. The club won the championship at the 2004 Emperor's Cup and the 2005 Japanese Super Cup. In the same year they were removed from the J1 League which marked his end in Tokyo. He signed with Omiya Ardija at the start of the 2006 season. As Omiya usually deployed a 4–4–2 formation, he usually played as a central/defensive midfielder. Kobayashi was the key player on the team, and at times the team's captain. However he gradually played less often during 2009. In June 2009, he moved to Kashiwa Reysol. On January 14, 2010 it was announced that Kobayashi had signed with Albirex Niigata. He played in many matches until 2011. However he did not play as much in 2012 and he retired at the end of the 2012 season, after a fourteen-year professional career.

Managerial career 
Kobayashi started his coaching career in June 2014, serving as a coach of Vegalta Sendai until 2019. In 2021, he joined JEF United Chiba also as a coach, and promoted to the role of head coach of the Chiba side in 2022. 

On 1 November 2022, he was appointed manager of JEF United Chiba from 2023 season.

Club statistics

Managerial statistics

References

External links

1978 births
Living people
Komazawa University alumni
Association football people from Saitama Prefecture
Japanese footballers
J1 League players
Tokyo Verdy players
Omiya Ardija players
Kashiwa Reysol players
Albirex Niigata players
Association football midfielders
Japanese football managers
J2 League managers
JEF United Chiba managers